Arnfinn Graue (October 1, 1926 - February 28, 2021) was a Norwegian nuclear physicist. 

He was born in Bergen. He was appointed a docent at the University of Bergen from 1961, took the dr.philos. degree in 1966 and was promoted to professor in experimental nuclear physics in 1971. He served as dean of the Faculty of Natural Sciences from 1978 to 1980, vice rector from 1981 to 1983 and rector from 1984 to 1989. He was also a Norwegian delegate to CERN from 1984.

References

1926 births
2021 deaths
Scientists from Bergen
Norwegian nuclear physicists
Academic staff of the University of Bergen
Rectors of the University of Bergen
People associated with CERN